CRL Group plc is a defunct British video game development and publishing company. Originally CRL stood for "Computer Rentals Limited". It was based in King's Yard, London and run by Clem Chambers.

They released a number of notable adventure games based on horror stories. Dracula and Frankenstein were rated 15 certificate by the British Board of Film Censors for their graphics depicting bloody scenes; Dracula was the first game to be rated by the BBFC. Jack the Ripper was the first game to receive an 18 certificate, Wolfman also gained an 18 certificate.

CRL-published games that achieved critical success include Tau Ceti and Academy.

The 1984 game of the series Terrahawks was one of the first video games based on a TV show.

Games

1982 
 Rescue

1983 
3D Desert Patrol
Alien Maze
Bomber
Caveman
Crawler
Derby Day
Draughts
Escape from Manhattan
Galactic Patrol
Grand National
Jackpot
Lunar Rescue
One Day Cricket
Pandemonia
Test Match
The Omega Run
The Orb
Space Mission
Zaraks

1984 
£.s.d.
Ahhh!!
Cricket 64
Glug Glug
Handicap Golf
Handy Andy
Incredible Adventure
Olympics
Orpheus in the Underworld
Show Jumping
Terrahawks
The Great Detective
The Magic Roundabout
Tritz
Whirlybird
The War of the Worlds
The Warlock's Treasure
The Woods of Winter

1985 
Blade Runner
Bored of the Rings
Endurance
Formula One
Juggernaut
Space Doubt
Tau Ceti
The Causes of Chaos
The Rocky Horror Show

1986
Academy
Bugsy
Doctor What!
Dracula
Hercules
Pilgrim
Robin of Sherlock
Room Ten
Samurai
The Boggit
The Very Big Cave Adventure

1987
Ball Breaker
Book of the Dead
Cyborg
Death or Glory
Federation
Frankenstein
From Darkness into Light
I-Alien
IQ
Jack the Ripper
Jet-Boys
Last Mohican
Lifeforce
Loads of Midnight
Mandroid
Murder off Miami
Ninja Hamster
Oink!
Outcast
Plasmatron
Sun Star
They Call Me Trooper
Traxxion
Vengeance

1988
Ball Breaker II
CounterForce
Cyberknights
Discovery
International Soccer
Kellogg's Tour 1988
NATO Assault Course
Purple Heart
Road Warrior
Sophistry
Thunder Cross
Time Fighter
To Hell and Back
Trigger Happy
Wolfman

1989
Inner Space
Lancaster
Professional Soccer
Search for the Titanic

1990
Hellhole

Unreleased
Enchantress
Spearhead
The Blues Brothers
The Malinsay Massacre

Software
Fifth (1983)
Stargazer Secrets (1983)
Highway Code (1984)
3D Game Maker (1987)
2D Game Maker (1988)
Hi-Rise Scaffold Construction Set (Unreleased)

Platforms
Acorn Electron
Amiga
Amstrad CPC
Amstrad PCW
Atari ST
BBC Micro
Commodore 64
Commodore Plus/4
MS-DOS
Oric-1/Atmos
ZX Spectrum

Notes
 Hercules was originally released in 1984 by Interdisc
 Bored of the Rings and Robin of Sherlock were originally released in 1985 by Delta 4
 Federation was originally released as Quann Tulla in 1985 by 8th Day Software
 International Soccer was originally only released on cartridge in 1983 by Commodore International

References

Further reading
Retro Gamer Magazine, issue 97, Graeme Mason

External links

The story behind the worst game ever made

Defunct video game companies of the United Kingdom
Video game development companies
Video game publishers